The Pro Europe demonstration took place in the capital of Moldova, Chișinău, on 3 November 2013. The demonstration was organised by three parties of the ruling coalition: Liberal Democratic Party of Moldova, Democratic Party of Moldova and Liberal Reformists Party. It's estimated that around 100,000 people participated at the demonstration, at that time being the biggest mass group or collection of groups of people, since Moldovan Declaration of Independence.

Details
Originally, the organisers said the demonstration involved around 100,000 people, but the police estimated the crowd at 60,000 people. However, the police reevaluated this number and in an official communication declared that around 117,000 people took part. The crowd of people gathered in Moldova's capital Chișinău, on November 3, 2013 to show their support for closer ties with the European Union. It came a few weeks before a summit in Vilnius, Lithuania where Moldova hoped to sign a partnership agreement with the EU.

Moldovan President, Nicolae Timofti, told the crowds: 

The demonstration was organised by the Moldovan government which wants to send a clear message to Brussels. However the country is under pressure from Russia which says closer ties with the EU would have “serious consequences” for Moldovan workers in Russia and the export of its goods.

At the opening ceremony of demonstration, Moldovan soprano singer Valentina Naforniță, performed the Anthem of Moldova.

At the end of demonstration, participants have voted the ″Declaration from Chișinău″.

Aftermath
Along with Ukraine and Georgia, Moldova entered into an association agreement with the EU in June 2014.

See also
2009 Moldova civil unrest
2015–16 protests in Moldova
 List of protests in the 21st century

References

2013 in Moldova
History of Moldova since 1991
History of Chișinău
Anti-communism in Moldova
Protests in Moldova
Pro-Europeanism in Moldova